François Sakama is a Vanuatuan footballer who plays as a midfielder for ABM Galaxy. Since 2017, he is also the assistant coach of the Vanuatu national football team.

International goals

References

Living people
1987 births
Vanuatuan footballers
Vanuatu international footballers
Tafea F.C. players
Association football midfielders
2008 OFC Nations Cup players
2012 OFC Nations Cup players
Vanuatu under-20 international footballers